Cilium may refer to:
 Cilium, cell organelles
 Cilium (entomology), fine hairs on insect wings

Disambiguation pages